The iPhone Photography Awards (IPPAWARDS) is an international photography contest for images captured with an iPhone. The award was founded in 2007, the same year the first iPhone was released. The contest is held annually, with one grand prize winner and three overall winners, as well as three winners for each of 19 subcategories.

Prior winners

2020 

 Grand Prize Winner, Photographer of the Year - Dimpy Bhalotia
 1st Place - Artyom Baryshau
 2nd Place - Geli Zhao
 3rd Place - Saif Hussain

2019
1st Place - Diogo Lage
2nd Place - Yuliya Ibraeva
3rd Place - Peng Hao

2018
 1st Place - Alexandre Weber
 2nd Place - Huapeng Zhao
 3rd Place - Zarni Myo Win

2017
1st Place - Sebastiano Tomada
2nd Place - Yeow-Kwang Yeo
3rd Place - Kuanglong Zhang

2016
1st Place - Siyuan Niu
2nd Place - Patryk Kuleta
3rd Place - Robin Robertis

2015

1st Place - Michal Koralewski
2nd Place - David Craik
3rd Place - Yvonne Lu

References

External links
IPPAWARDS official website

Photography awards
International awards
IPhone